South Carolina Highway 83 (SC 83) is a  primary state highway in the U.S. state of South Carolina. It connects the communities of eastern Marlboro County with Maxton, North Carolina.

Route description
SC 83 is a two-lane rural highway that traverses from a point northeast of Clio at SC 381 to the North Carolina state line where the road continues as North Carolina Highway 83 (NC 83).

History
The highway was established in 1938 as a renumbering of SC 68 to match NC 83; no changes have been made since.

Major intersections

See also

References

External links

083
Transportation in Marlboro County, South Carolina